The X-Files Season 11 is an 8+1-issue comic book series published by IDW Publishing. The title follows The X-Files Season 10 comic book series and serves as an extension of the television series The X-Files. Chris Carter, who created the television series, is the executive producer of the comic book series, while the issues are written by Joe Harris and illustrated by Matthew Dow Smith and Jordie Bellaire.

Publication

Issues

Hardcover Collected Volumes

2015 comics debuts
Comics based on television series
Science fiction comics
Season 11
Horror comics